Nicolaas Hendrik Christiaan de Jong Theunissen (4 May 1867 – 9 November 1929) was a South African cricketer who played in one Test in 1889. He became a minister.

Career
Theunissen was an opening bowler who took 34 wickets in three non-first-class matches for provincial sides against the touring R. G. Warton's XI in 1888–89. Selected for South Africa in the Second Test at the end of the tour, he opened the bowling but failed to take a wicket.

In 1889–90 he played two first-class matches in Cape Town. In the first, he took 5 for 55 and 6 for 53 for Western Province against Natal. In the second, which began the day after the previous one ended, he took 2 for 47 and 7 for 41 for Cape Town Clubs against Natal.

From 1916 until his death in 1929, Theunissen was a minister in the Transvaal town of Greylingstad.

References

1867 births
1929 deaths
People from Colesberg
South Africa Test cricketers
South African cricketers
Western Province cricketers
20th-century clergy